Ternstroemia landae is a species of plant in the Pentaphylacaceae family. It is endemic to Honduras.

References

landae
Endemic flora of Honduras
Critically endangered flora of North America
Taxonomy articles created by Polbot